Clarke County High School is a public high school in Grove Hill, Alabama. Its mascot is the Bulldogs and the school colors are royal blue and white. The school runs on a four-block schedule. Christopher Young became the school's principal in 2020. Athletics include boys and girls basketball, baseball, softball, volleyball, football, and cheer. The school currently competes at the 2A level in Region 1.

The Bulldogs won state championships in Football (2021), Boys' Basketball (1989), Girls' Basketball (1991), Girls' Outdoor Track, (1979, 1980, 1984, 1986, 1987, 1988, 1989, 1990, and 1991) and Girls' Indoor Track (1983, 1988, and 1991.)

External links
 CCHS website

References

Schools in Clarke County, Alabama
Public high schools in Alabama